Benthophilus kessleri is a species of goby widespread along the eastern coasts of the Caspian Sea from the Urdyuk Cape to Kuuli Cape and Türkmenbaşy at south. It can reach a length of  TL. The specific name honours the German-Russian zoologist Karl Fedorovich Kessler (1815-1881).

References

Benthophilus
Fish of the Caspian Sea
Fish of Central Asia
Endemic fauna of the Caspian Sea
Fish described in 1927